Patna is one of the 147 Legislative Assembly constituencies of Odisha state in India. It is in Kendujhar district" and is reserved for candidates belonging to the Scheduled Tribes. It is a segment of the Kendujhar parliamentary constituency.

In 2019 election Biju Janata Dal candidate Jagannath Naik, defeated BJP candidate Bhabani Sankar Nayak.

Extent of the constituency
Area of this constituency includes Patna block, Saharpada block, 10 GPs (Asanpat, Khuntapada, Badadumuria, Badaneuli, Baria, Dhanurjayapur, Gundunia, Tukudiha, Ukhunda and Chauthia GPs of Jhumpura block and 6 GPs of (Jajaposi, Jally, Sadangi, Jyotipur, Bhuinpur and Parsala) of Champua block.
As of 2019 it had a total of 1,96,060 voters out of which 99,293 were male and 96,767 were female.

Members of the Legislative Assembly

Election Results

2019 Election Results

2014 Election Results

2009 Election Results

See also
List of constituencies of the Odisha Legislative Assembly
Kendujhar district

Notes

References

Assembly constituencies of Odisha
Kendujhar district